Granville Island Hotel is a hotel in Vancouver, British Columbia, Canada. The hotel is located on Granville Island and is cited as "one of Vancouver's best kept secrets".

References

External links
Official site

Hotels in Vancouver